"Hard Row" is a single by American blues-rock duo the Black Keys from their second album Thickfreakness. The song, along with the rest of Thickfreakness, was recorded in drummer Patrick Carney's basement on a 1980 8-track recorder. The lyrics were written by Chuck Auerbach and bandmember Dan Auerbach, and the music composed by both members of the band.

Track listing 
 Hard Row (7")
 Evil (7")

 Hard Row (CD)
 Set You Free (CD)
 Evil (CD)

In media

Hard Row is the opening song in the first episode of the first season of the TV-series Sons of Anarchy.

Personnel 
Dan Auerbach - guitars, vocals
Patrick Carney - percussion, drums

2003 singles
The Black Keys songs
Songs written by Dan Auerbach
Songs written by Patrick Carney